Sabzevar is a city in Razavi Khorasan Province, Iran.

Sabzevar may also refer to:

Sabzevar, Lorestan, a village in Lorestan Province, Iran
Sabzevar County, an administrative subdivision of Iran
Shindand, formerly known as Sabzevar